Sandhyarani Devi Wangkhem (born 1 February 1983) is an Indian martial art athlete from Manipur, who participates in Women's Sanshou (Wushu) 56 kg category.

Sandhyarani won a Silver medal at the 2010 Asian Games in Guangzhou, China. Fighting with a calf injury, she was defeated by Iranian Khadijeh Azadpour, who was the defending champion in 60 kg category. She had sustained the injury in the semi-final win against Laos' Paloy Barckkam, due to this her kicking ability was severely hampered  and she had to play defensively. Sandhyarani fought in 60 kg category as the 56 kg category was not included in the games schedule.

She has previously won a Bronze medal in 2008 Asian Championships in Macau and Silver medal at 2009 Asian Martial Arts Games in Women's Sanshou 56 kg.

Sandhyarani is a Central Reserve Police Force constable and hails from eastern state of Manipur. She belongs to the Thoubal district where the freestyle form of Sanshou is popular. Sandhyarani was a boxer but later shifted to Wushu since it was more all-round.

References 

Living people
Sportswomen from Manipur
1983 births
People from Thoubal district
Asian Games medalists in wushu
Indian sanshou practitioners
Wushu practitioners at the 2010 Asian Games
Wushu practitioners at the 2014 Asian Games
Asian Games silver medalists for India
Medalists at the 2010 Asian Games
Martial artists from Manipur
Recipients of the Arjuna Award